Głażewo may refer to the following places in Poland:
Głażewo, Kuyavian-Pomeranian Voivodeship (north-central Poland)
Głażewo, Greater Poland Voivodeship (west-central Poland)